The Zhonghua Street Night Market is a night market in Fengshan District, Kaohsiung, Taiwan.

History
The night market opened in the 1950s. In 1965, the Kaohsiung County Government officially set up the area to be a night market.

Architecture
The night market is located at the intersection of Zhongshan Street and Guangyuan Road on a 3 km (1.9 mi) long street with over more than 500 food stalls. Many delicacies such as fig jelly, salted crispy chicken, chicken rice, beef noodles and herb tea can be found in the night market. It also has cultural interests and temples.

Transportation
The night market is accessible by walking about 100m (350ft) north of exit 2 of the Fongshan Station of the Kaohsiung MRT.

See also
 Night markets in Taiwan
 List of night markets in Taiwan

References

Night markets in Kaohsiung